Pow! is a 2003 novel by the Chinese author and Nobel laureate Mo Yan. The novel's protagonist is Luo Xiaotong, a village boy with a passion for story-telling. It is set in a temple, where Luo recounts the story of his life to an old monk. He describes the difficult circumstances of his childhood in the "Slaughterhouse Village," a fictional town in which the population is obsessed with the consumption of meat and where corruption is rife.
 
The novel has been interpreted as an allegorical commentary on the state of contemporary Chinese society, though Mo himself maintains that he is merely a storyteller, uninterested in ideology.

References

2003 Chinese novels
Novels set in China
Novels by Mo Yan